Marva Whitney (born Marva Ann Manning; May 1, 1944 – December 22, 2012) was an American funk singer commonly referred to by her honorary title, Soul Sister #1. Whitney was considered by many funk enthusiasts to be one of the "rawest" and "brassiest" music divas.

Biography

Early life
Born in Kansas City, Kansas, her performing career started as early as three years old while touring with her family's gospel group, the Manning Gospel Singers. At the age of 16 she joined the Alma Whitney Singers and two years later she married Harry Olander Whitney with whom she had a daughter Sherrie Whitney. She began singing R&B music for the first time in 1963 at a Kansas City venue and studied music at college. Whilst working at a garment factory, she continued performing in nightclubs and at local talent competitions, and by the mid-1960s had joined local group Tommy (Gadson) & The Derbys as their lead singer. The group opened for many leading performers passing through Kansas City. In 1967, she left the group, and turned down offers to tour with Bobby Bland and Little Richard before joining the James Brown Revue as a featured vocalist. Her marriage to Harry Olander Whitney ended in divorce in 1965. Subsequently, she was married, albeit briefly to disc jockey Phil Wardell.

Career
Her first solo single, "Your Love Was Good To Me", was recorded for King Records in mid-1967, but was unsuccessful as were two follow-up singles. She toured Europe, Asia and Africa with James Brown with whom she was in a relationship, and in early 1968 he produced her fourth solo single, "Unwind Yourself", in a more funky style. Although the record was not a chart hit, it was later sampled numerous times, most recognisably by the 45 King on his 1987 track "The 900 Number", which was then sampled by DJ Chad Jackson on his 1990 hit single "Hear the Drummer (Get Wicked)" (UK number 3 in July 1990), by DJ Kool on his 1996 hit "Let Me Clear My Throat" (UK number 6 in March 1997), Sway on his 2009 track "Mercedes Benz" and Mac Miller on his 2011 track "Party on Fifth Ave."

Whitney's first chart hit came with "It's My Thing (You Can't Tell Me Who to Sock It To)," a response to The Isley Brothers' hit "It's Your Thing"; her record reached number 19 on the Billboard R&B chart and number 82 on the Billboard Hot 100 in 1969. She followed up with two smaller hits, "Things Got To Get Better (Get Together)" (R&B number 22) and "I Made A Mistake Because It's Only You Pt. 1" (R&B number 32), and also recorded songs like "I'm Tired, I'm Tired, I'm Tired (Things Better Change Before Its Too Late)", and "If You Don't Work (You Can't Eat)." After recording three albums - Unwind Yourself (1968), Live and Lowdown at the Apollo [actually live in Georgia] (1969) and It's My Thing (1969) - and about 13 singles with James Brown as producer and writer or co-writer, an exhausted Whitney left the Brown stable in 1969 (or 1970) and returned to Kansas City.

Clarence Cooper and Allan Bell took over her management and initially struggled to get Whitney into major venues. A trip to Chicago in 1970 and a visit to producer Floyd Smith resulted in a contract for the Isley Brothers' T-Neck label. After divorcing Phil Wardell, she married Ellis Taylor of Forte Records with whom she had a son, and recorded further singles for the label, including "Daddy Don't Know About Sugar Bear", her most successful post Brown single that was picked up for national distribution by Nashville's Excello records. She retired from recording for several years making only local appearances in Kansas City, returning to the studio in 1977 for a Forte single with her brother Melvin Manning. She divorced Taylor in 1977 and relocated to Los Angeles for the next fifteen years.

In the early 1980s, she briefly joined a group, Coffee, Cream & Sugar, formed by singer Alfred "Pico" Payne and Mary Lou Flesh. Later in the 1980s, she started to perform regularly with former James Brown band members such as Maceo Parker, Fred Wesley, Pee Wee Ellis, and Lyn Collins, as the JB Allstars. She returned to Kansas City as it became apparent that Funk music was essentially unfashionable and opportunities were sparse. She later married for the fourth time a preacher and returned to her gospel roots.

In 2006, Whitney collaborated with German born DJ/collector/manager DJ Pari and Japanese funk orchestra Osaka Monaurail to produce a new single, "I Am What I Am". Osaka Monaurail style themselves on the James Brown sound and the single was produced in the fashion of an authentic release of the recordings she produced with Brown in 1969. Two successful tours of Japan and a full-length album release followed, also entitled "I Am What I Am". In 2007, 2008 and 2009, the tour was also brought to Europe where she maintained a cult following.

In December 2009, Whitney had a stroke on stage during a concert in Lorne, Australia, while performing with The Transatlantics at Falls Festival. The remaining dates of her tour were cancelled; after Whitney made a partial recovery she performed again in 2010. In December 2012, Whitney died from complications of pneumonia at her home. She was 68.

Discography

Album discography

Single discography on King Records

Single discography after King Records

References

External links
 
 
 

1944 births
2012 deaths
Musicians from Kansas City, Kansas
American soul singers
American funk singers
Deaths from pneumonia in Kansas
James Brown vocalists
Excello Records artists
20th-century African-American women singers
21st-century African-American women singers